Second Impact can refer to:
 Second impact (safety), the impact suffered by a vehicle occupant between his body and whatever stops it from moving inside the vehicle in a crash
 Second-impact syndrome, a rare, deadly condition in which the brain swells as the result of a concussion received before symptoms from another concussion have gone away
 Street Fighter III: 2nd Impact - Giant Attack, a version of Street Fighter III.
 The Second Impact, a cataclysmic event in the anime Neon Genesis Evangelion